Nina Bjedov (Serbian Cyrillic: Нина Бједов, born May 18, 1972) is a former Serbian female basketball player.

See also 
 List of Serbian WNBA players

External links
Profile at eurobasket.com

1971 births
Living people
Los Angeles Sparks players
Power forwards (basketball)
Serbian expatriate basketball people in the United States
Serbian women's basketball players
Basketball players from Belgrade
Yugoslav women's basketball players
ŽKK Crvena zvezda players
ŽKK Vršac players
Women's National Basketball Association players from Serbia
Serbian expatriate basketball people in France
Serbian expatriate basketball people in Italy